Elections to Northamptonshire County Council took place on 4 June 2009, having been delayed from 7 May, in order to coincide with elections to the European Parliament. The Liberal Democrats replaced the Labour Party as the main opposition.

Results

|}

Division-by-Division results, by District

Corby Borough

Daventry District

East Northamptonshire District

Kettering Borough

Northampton Borough

South Northamptonshire District

Wellingborough Borough

References

2009 English local elections
2009
2000s in Northamptonshire